Gregorio Araneta Avenue is a suburban arterial road in the Santa Mesa Heights area of Quezon City, northeastern Metro Manila, Philippines. It is a 6- to 8-lane divided avenue designated as part of Circumferential Road 3 (C-3) and physical continuation of Sergeant Rivera Street which travels from Santo Domingo Avenue at its north end near Balintawak in Quezon City, and meets N. Domingo Street in the south in San Juan near the border with Santa Mesa, Manila. En route, it intersects with Del Monte Avenue, Quezon Avenue, Eulogio Rodriguez Sr. Avenue and Magsaysay-Aurora Boulevard passing through barangays Balingasa, Manresa, Masambong, Sienna, Santo Domingo, Talayan, Tatalon, Santol, and Doña Imelda in Quezon City and Progreso in San Juan.

The avenue lies in a flood-prone zone in close proximity to the San Francisco del Monte and San Juan Rivers. It was named after lawyer and landowner Gregorio S. Araneta who owned the Santa Mesa Heights Subdivision on which the avenue was built.

A man-made waterway median runs through the middle of the road, that momentarily terminates in the Del Monte Avenue intersection, and continues immediately, terminating before the Quezon Avenue intersection. As a result of the Skyway Stage 3 project, parts of the waterway median will be converted into a closed culvert and will become a part of the passable road.

The Metro Manila Skyway Stage 3 traverses almost the entire length of the road, starting from Sergeant Rivera Avenue down to San Juan River.

Funeral row
Gregorio Araneta Avenue is best known as the location of some of the biggest funeral parlors in the metropolis. These are the Arlington Memorial Chapels, La Funeraria Paz, Ascension Columbary, Cosmopolitan, Nacional Memorial Homes, and the Sanctuarium (formerly Capitol Memorial). The oldest is Funeraria Nacional which moved to Gregorio Araneta from its old address in downtown Avenida Rizal in 1968. It was followed by La Funeraria Paz in the 1970s and Arlington, which converted the old Thomas Jefferson Library on the avenue into a funeral facility, in 1985.

Automated Trash Rake
In 2014, the Department of Science and Technology built an automated garbage rake in the intersection of Araneta Avenue and Mauban Street, functioning as a cleaning facility for the river, in response to the perennial flooding and garbage problems in the area. Garbage trucks regularly collected garbages that were captured from the river, as well as those dumped nearby.

Intersections

References

Streets in Quezon City